Extreme Universe is a documentary about extremeness of our Universe. It consists of 6 episodes. The series is written by Rob Blumenstein and John Coll Metcalfe.

Episode List

See also
How the Universe Works
Killers of the Cosmos
The Planets and Beyond
Space's Deepest Secrets
Strip the Cosmos
Through the Wormhole
The Universe
Stephen Hawking's Universe

References
http://forums.mvgroup.org

External links
 
 
 DocuWiki link

English-language television shows
Documentary television series about science